Tombat may refer to:
 Tombat-e Bala
 Tombat-e Pain